Victor Westhoff (12 November 1916 in Situbondo, Dutch East Indies – 12 March 2001 in Zeist)  was a botanist at the Radboud University Nijmegen.

Westhoff published 700 scientific papers on phytosociology and conservation, as well as articles on classical music. He was a member of the International Association for Vegetation Science.

Between 1934 and 1942, Westhoff studied biology at Utrecht University and plant sociology with Josias Braun-Blanquet.  In August 1945, Westhoff presented a paper, "Het biosociologisch onderzoek van natuurmonumenten" that became a significant work behind nature conservation in the Netherlands.

In 1974 he became member of the Royal Netherlands Academy of Arts and Sciences.

He is a Honorary Member of the International Association for Vegetation Science (1988).

References

Further reading 

1916 births
2001 deaths
Phytogeographers
Dutch phytogeographers
Conservation biologists
Utrecht University alumni
Members of the Royal Netherlands Academy of Arts and Sciences
Academic staff of Radboud University Nijmegen
People from Situbondo Regency
20th-century Dutch botanists